Amarakavi is a 1952 Indian Tamil language film produced and directed by F. Nagoor. The film stars M. K. Thyagaraja Bhagavathar and T. R. Rajakumari.

Cast 
Adapted from the film credits.

Male cast
 M. K. Thyagaraja Bhagavathar as Amaran / Amarakavi
 N. S. Krishnan as Amaran's friend
 M. G. Chakrapani as Rajaguru
 K. Thangavelu as Amaran's friend
 Gundu Karuppaiah as Chettiyar
 Kottapuli Jayaraman as
 K. P. Kesavan
 M. S. Karupaiah
 Sethuraman
 Raja M. Dhandapani
 Thirupathi
Loose Arumugam
 Goshi-Dawood
 Thiyagarajan
 Muthu Ramalingam

Female cast
 T. R. Rajakumari as Padmini
 B. S. Saroja as Princess Mallika
 P. K. Saraswathi as Dasi dancer
 T. A. Mathuram as Princess's servant
 K. S. Angamuthu as Kaliamma / Padmini's mother
 Lalitha-Padmini as Special Appearances in a song
 Subbuthayi
 Kumari Susheela

Soundtrack 
Music was composed by G. Ramanathan and T. A. Kalyanam while the lyrics were penned by A. Maruthakasi, Suratha, Ka. Mu. Sheriff, Papanasam Sivan and Lakshmanadas.

References

External links 

1950s romance films
1950s Tamil-language films
1952 films
Films scored by G. Ramanathan
Films scored by T. A. Kalyanam
Indian black-and-white films
Indian romance films